Kirstin Lawton (born 17 November 1980 in Hemel Hempstead, England) is a British trampoline gymnast who represented Great Britain at the 2004 Summer Olympics.

References

External links
 

1980 births
Living people
British female trampolinists
Olympic gymnasts of Great Britain
Gymnasts at the 2004 Summer Olympics
Sportspeople from Hemel Hempstead
World Games silver medalists
Competitors at the 2001 World Games
Medalists at the Trampoline Gymnastics World Championships
21st-century British women